Lake Templene is a  artificial lake in St. Joseph County, Michigan. It was created in the early 1970s by damming the Prairie River.

History
In the late 1960s Floyd Templin pursued the idea to dam the Prairie River to create a lake to build houses around. He gathered some investors and proceeded to build a dam.

The lake became popular for fishing tournaments, and this caused a conflict between residents and non-resident fishermen. The Nottawa Township Board of Trustees brokered a compromise. The compromise called for a limit of 25 fishing tournaments per year and the creation of an official public boat launch.

See also
List of lakes in Michigan

References

External links
 Lake Templene Property Owners Association

Templene
Templene